The Havelock railway station is a former Canadian Pacific Railway station in Havelock, Ontario. It is recognized as a  Designated Heritage Railway Station. The station is located at mileage 93.70 of the Canadian Pacific's Havelock Subdivision.

The railway station is privately owned and not designated an Ontario Heritage building.

References

External links

Designated heritage railway stations in Ontario